Julius Neal Watlington (December 25, 1922 – December 29, 2019) was an American Major League Baseball player for the Philadelphia Athletics in 1953.

Watlington broke into professional baseball in the minor leagues in 1941, then missed five seasons (1942–46). He served in the United States Army in the European Theater of Operations during World War II, where he received a Purple Heart during his service and was 24 years old when he was signed as a free agent by the New York Giants in 1947. Primarily a catcher, Watlington was acquired by Philadelphia in February 1952 when the Athletics took over as parent team of the Triple-A Ottawa Giants of the International League.

The Athletics recalled Watlington from Ottawa in the midsummer of 1953, and he appeared in 21 games for them through the remainder of the American League season. He started seven games at catcher, served as a defensive replacement in one contest, and was a pinch hitter in 13 others. Watlington's 47 plate appearances produced seven hits, including one double, and three bases on balls. He scored four runs. He returned to the International League in 1954 and played five more seasons of Triple-A baseball until his 1958 retirement.

In 2016 Watlington received France's Legion of Honour medal for his combat services to help liberate that nation during World War II.

References

External links

1922 births
2019 deaths
Baseball players from North Carolina
Danville Leafs players
Jersey City Giants players
Knoxville Smokies players
Major League Baseball catchers
Mayodan Millers players
Military personnel from North Carolina
Ottawa A's players
Ottawa Giants players
People from Yanceyville, North Carolina
Philadelphia Athletics players
Recipients of the Legion of Honour
Richmond Virginians (minor league) players
Rochester Red Wings players
United States Army personnel of World War II